Khalid Alioua ( – born 1949, Rabat) is a Moroccan politician of the Socialist Union of Popular Forces party. He was Minister of Higher Education and Scientific Research in the cabinet of Driss Jettou (2002–2007) and Minister of Social Development, Solidarity, Employment, Vocational Training and spokesperson of the Government in the first cabinet of Abderrahman el-Yousfi (1998–2000). He has a degree in accounting and has taught at the University of Hassan II. In early July 2012, he was arrested on charges of embezzlement during his time as president of the CIH bank.

See also
Cabinet of Morocco

References

Government ministers of Morocco
1949 births
Living people
People from Rabat
Moroccan bankers
Moroccan educators
Academic staff of the University of Hassan II Casablanca
Moroccan chief executives
Socialist Union of Popular Forces politicians